Ezequiel Vicente Melillo (born 1 June 1990) is an Argentine professional footballer who plays as a midfielder for San Miguel.

Career
Melillo played in the youth ranks of Peñarol Infantil Olmos, before continuing his career with Villa San Carlos. Ten goals in fifty-five appearances arrived in three Primera B Metropolitana seasons from 2009–10, which included a hat-trick over Tristán Suárez on 11 August 2011. In July 2012, Melillo joined Primera División side Racing Club on loan. He didn't feature in 2012–13, a season which his parent club ended with promotion to Primera B Nacional; where he'd appear twenty-three times as they were relegated back down. Central Norte became Melillo's third team in 2015, which preceded him signing for San Telmo in 2016. 

After participating in sixty games and netting nine goals across two campaigns, Melillo completed a move to Almirante Brown on 13 June 2018. His debut came in a defeat to Estudiantes on 20 August, which was followed by his first goal against All Boys in September. July 2019 saw Melillo head across Primera B Metropolitana to Tristán Suárez. He scored five goals in twenty-one games in his first season there.

On 2 June 2022, Melillo joined San Miguel.

Career statistics
.

References

External links

1990 births
Living people
Footballers from La Plata
Argentine footballers
Association football midfielders
Primera B Metropolitana players
Primera Nacional players
Club Atlético Villa San Carlos footballers
Racing Club de Avellaneda footballers
Central Norte players
San Telmo footballers
Club Almirante Brown footballers
CSyD Tristán Suárez footballers
Club Atlético San Miguel footballers